A Plant Information Management System (PIMS) collects and integrates information about a production process from different sources.

Overview

Tasks
Important tasks of a PIMS are:

 Company-wide gather, consolidate and process data
 Analysis of production performance, product quality, process capacity and control compliance.
 Provide Key Performance Indicator (KPI) to improve decision-making processes
 Reporting for decision support and documentation
 Consolidation of data from different sources (Enterprise Resource Planning (ERP), Laboratory, Distributed Control System (DCS)...)
 Integration of off-line data (laboratory, calculations, future load profiles)
 Access via the company-wide intranet also from offices. Via Web (Thin client) or Tcp / Ip (Fat client)
 Enriching / refining raw data
 Event-driven calculations
 Long-term archiving of data and reports (over many years)

Manufacturers
Manufacturers are:
 Aspen Tech InfoPlus.21 (IP.21)
 GE Proficy Historian
 Open Systems International Inc. CHRONUS™
 Osisoft PI
 Honeywell PHD
 Wonderware Historian
 Iba-ag Davis

Subdivisions
There are the following subdivisions:
 SQL / desktop systems
 SCADA Historian
 Enterprise Historian

See also
 Data acquisition
 Data collection system
 Totally integrated automation

References

Information systems
Industrial software